The 1977 Cal State Los Angeles Golden Eagles baseball team is a baseball team that represented California State University, Los Angeles in the 1977 NCAA Division I baseball season. The Golden Eagles were members of the Southern California Baseball Association and played their home games at Reeder Field in Los Angeles, California. They were led by first-year head coach Jack Deutsch.

Roster

Schedule 

! style="" | Regular Season
|- valign="top" 

|- align="center" bgcolor="#ccffcc"
| 1 || February || vs  || Unknown • Unknown, California || 4–2 || 1–0 || –
|- align="center" bgcolor="#ffcccc"
| 2 || February 18 ||  || Reeder Field • Los Angeles, California || 0–7 || 1–1 || –
|- align="center" bgcolor="#ccffcc"
| 3 || February || vs  || Unknown • Unknown, California || 18–5 || 2–1 || –
|- align="center" bgcolor="#ccffcc"
| 4 || February || vs Whittier || Unknown • Unknown, California || 7–3 || 3–1 || –
|- align="center" bgcolor="#ccffcc"
| 5 || February || vs  || Unknown • Unknown, California || 6–5 || 4–1 || –
|- align="center" bgcolor="#ffcccc"
| 6 || February || vs Cal Poly || Unknown • Unknown, California || 1–10 || 4–2 || –
|- align="center" bgcolor="#ffcccc"
| 7 || February || vs Cal Poly || Unknown • Unknown, California || 5–6 || 4–3 || –
|- align="center" bgcolor="#ccffcc"
| 8 || February ||  || Reeder Field • Los Angeles, California || 12–7 || 5–3 || –
|- align="center" bgcolor="#ffcccc"
| 9 || February 26 ||  || Reeder Field • Los Angeles, California || 5–6 || 5–4 || –
|- align="center" bgcolor="#ffcccc"
| 10 || February 26 || UCLA || Reeder Field • Los Angeles, California || 1–4 || 5–5 || –
|- align="center" bgcolor="#ffcccc"
| 11 || February  || vs  || Unknown • Unknown, California || 10–11 || 5–6 || –
|-

|- align="center" bgcolor="#ccffcc"
| 12 || March 1 || at  || Unknown • Azusa, California || 18–8 || 6–6 || –
|- align="center" bgcolor="#ffcccc"
| 13 || March ||  || Reeder Field • Los Angeles, California || 3–6 || 6–7 || 0–1
|- align="center" bgcolor="#ccffcc"
| 14 || March ||  || Reeder Field • Los Angeles, California || 7–2 || 7–7 || 1–1
|- align="center" bgcolor="#ccffcc"
| 15 || March 7 || at  || Unknown • La Mirada, California || 5–2 || 8–7 || 1–1
|- align="center" bgcolor="#ccffcc"
| 16 || March || vs  || Unknown • Unknown, California || 3–0 || 9–7 || 1–1
|- align="center" bgcolor="#ccffcc"
| 17 || March ||  || Reeder Field • Los Angeles, California || 12–8 || 10–7 || 1–1
|- align="center" bgcolor="#ffcccc"
| 18 || March 11 ||  || Reeder Field • Los Angeles, California || 3–4 || 10–8 || 1–2
|- align="center" bgcolor="#ccffcc"
| 19 || March || at  || Blair Field • Long Beach, California || 16–4 || 11–8 || 2–2
|- align="center" bgcolor="#ccffcc"
| 20 || March 18 || at  || Unknown • Riverside, California || 10–4 || 12–8 || 2–2
|- align="center" bgcolor="#ffcccc"
| 21 || March 19 || UC Riverside || Reeder Field • Los Angeles, California || 6–10 || 12–9 || 2–2
|- align="center" bgcolor="#ffcccc"
| 22 || March 19 || UC Riverside || Reeder Field • Los Angeles, California || 3–9 || 12–10 || 2–2
|- align="center" bgcolor="#ccffcc"
| 23 || March  || vs  || Unknown • Unknown, California || 3–1 || 13–10 || 2–2
|- align="center" bgcolor="#ccffcc"
| 24 || March 29 || at  || Unknown • Irvine, California || 11–7 || 14–10 || 2–2
|-

|- align="center" bgcolor="#ccffcc"
| 25 || April || vs Chapman || Unknown • Unknown, California || 8–2 || 15–10 || 2–2
|- align="center" bgcolor="#ccffcc"
| 26 || April 9 ||  || Reeder Field • Los Angeles, California || 5–4 || 16–10 || 3–2
|- align="center" bgcolor="#ffcccc"
| 27 || April 9 || San Diego State || Reeder Field • Los Angeles, California || 3–9 || 16–11 || 3–3
|- align="center" bgcolor="#ffcccc"
| 28 || April 12 || at USC || Dedeaux Field • Los Angeles, California || 2–15 || 16–12 || 3–3
|- align="center" bgcolor="#ccffcc"
| 29 || April 15 || Loyola Marymount || Reeder Field • Los Angeles, California || 9–6 || 17–12 || 4–3
|- align="center" bgcolor="#ffcccc"
| 30 || April 16 || at Loyola Marymount || Unknown • Los Angeles, California || 1–8 || 17–13 || 4–4
|- align="center" bgcolor="#ccffcc"
| 31 || April 16 || at Loyola Marymount || Unknown • Los Angeles, California || 4–0 || 18–13 || 5–4
|- align="center" bgcolor="#ccffcc"
| 32 || April  || Claremont || Unknown • Unknown, California || 7–4 || 19–13 || 5–4
|- align="center" bgcolor="#ccffcc"
| 33 || April 22 || at  || Titan Field • Fullerton, California || 2–0 || 20–13 || 6–4
|- align="center" bgcolor="#ccffcc"
| 34 || April 23 || Cal State Fullerton || Reeder Field • Los Angeles, California || 9–8 || 21–13 || 7–4
|- align="center" bgcolor="#ccffcc"
| 35 || April 23 || Cal State Fullerton || Reeder Field • Los Angeles, California || 4–1 || 22–13 || 8–4
|- align="center" bgcolor="#ccffcc"
| 36 || April || vs Cal State Dominguez Hills || Unknown • Unknown, California || 6–5 || 23–13 || 8–4
|- align="center" bgcolor="#ccffcc"
| 37 || April 27 || Biola || Reeder Field • Los Angeles, California || 9–3 || 24–13 || 8–4
|- align="center" bgcolor="#ccffcc"
| 38 || April || vs Cal Poly Pomona || Unknown • Unknown, California || 10–1 || 25–13 || 8–4
|- align="center" bgcolor="#ffcccc"
| 39 || April 30 || at UCLA || Sawtelle Field • Los Angeles, California || 1–6 || 25–14 || 8–4
|- align="center" bgcolor="#ccffcc"
| 40 || April 30 || at UCLA || Sawtelle Field • Los Angeles, California || 5–3 || 26–14 || 8–4
|-

|- align="center" bgcolor="#ffcccc"
| 41 || May 1 || at UCLA || Sawtelle Field • Los Angeles, California || 4–10 || 26–15 || 8–4
|- align="center" bgcolor="#ffcccc"
| 42 || May || vs  || Unknown • Unknown, California || 2–7 || 26–16 || 8–4
|- align="center" bgcolor="#ccffcc"
| 43 || May || at Cal State Fullerton || Titan Field • Fullerton, California || 1–0 || 27–16 || 9–4
|- align="center" bgcolor="#ccffcc"
| 44 || May || Pepperdine || Reeder Field • Los Angeles, California || 2–1 || 28–16 || 10–4
|- align="center" bgcolor="#ccffcc"
| 45 || May || at Long Beach State || Blair Field • Long Beach, California || 13–9 || 29–16 || 11–4
|- align="center" bgcolor="#ccffcc"
| 46 || May || Long Beach State || Reeder Field • Los Angeles, California || 9–3 || 30–16 || 12–4
|- align="center" bgcolor="#ccffcc"
| 47 || May || Long Beach State || Reeder Field • Los Angeles, California || 12–10 || 31–16 || 13–4
|- align="center" bgcolor="#ccffcc"
| 48 || May 17 || at San Diego State || Unknown • San Diego, California || 7–5 || 32–16 || 14–4
|- align="center" bgcolor="#ccffcc"
| 49 || May 17 || at San Diego State || Unknown • San Diego, California || 5–3 || 33–16 || 15–4
|- align="center" bgcolor="#ccffcc"
| 50 || May || UC Santa Barbara || Reeder Field • Los Angeles, California || 10–5 || 34–16 || 16–4
|- align="center" bgcolor="#ccffcc"
| 51 || May || UC Santa Barbara || Reeder Field • Los Angeles, California || 18–8 || 35–16 || 17–4
|- align="center" bgcolor="#ffcccc"
| 52 || May || UC Santa Barbara || Reeder Field • Los Angeles, California || 6–9 || 35–17 || 17–5
|- align="center" bgcolor="#ffcccc"
| 53 || May || at Pepperdine || Eddy D. Field Stadium • Malibu, California || 0–4 || 35–18 || 17–6
|- align="center" bgcolor="#ffcccc"
| 54 || May || at Pepperdine || Eddy D. Field Stadium • Malibu, California || 4–5 || 35–19 || 17–7
|-

|-
! style="" | Postseason
|- valign="top"

|- align="center" bgcolor="#ccffcc"
| 55 || May || vs Cal State Fullerton || Unknown • Unknown, California || 6–3 || 36–19 || 17–7
|-

|- align="center" bgcolor="#ffcccc"
| 56 || May 26 || vs  || UH Stadium • Honolulu, Hawaii || 4–7 || 36–20 || 17–7
|- align="center" bgcolor="#ccffcc"
| 57 || May 27 || at  || UH Stadium • Honolulu, Hawaii || 8–4 || 37–20 || 17–7
|- align="center" bgcolor="#ccffcc"
| 58 || May 28 || vs Fresno State || UH Stadium • Honolulu, Hawaii || 15–11 || 38–20 || 17–7
|- align="center" bgcolor="#ccffcc"
| 59 || May 28 || vs USC || UH Stadium • Honolulu, Hawaii || 6–5 || 39–20 || 17–7
|- align="center" bgcolor="#ccffcc"
| 60 || May 29 || vs USC || UH Stadium • Honolulu, Hawaii || 7–6 || 40–20 || 17–7
|-

|- align="center" bgcolor="#ccffcc"
| 61 || June 11 || vs Minnesota || Johnny Rosenblatt Stadium • Omaha, Nebraska || 7–4 || 41–20 || 17–7
|- align="center" bgcolor="#ffcccc"
| 62 || June 13 || vs South Carolina || Johnny Rosenblatt Stadium • Omaha, Nebraska || 2–6 || 41–21 || 17–7
|- align="center" bgcolor="#ccffcc"
| 63 || June 14 || vs Clemson || Johnny Rosenblatt Stadium • Omaha, Nebraska || 1–0 || 42–21 || 17–7
|- align="center" bgcolor="#ffcccc"
| 64 || June 16 || vs  || Johnny Rosenblatt Stadium • Omaha, Nebraska || 7–9 || 42–22 || 17–7
|-

Awards and honors 
Gary Adair
 All-SCBA

Darrell Brown
 All-SCBA

Al Esparza
 All-SCBA

Javier Fierro
 All-SCBA

Jack Hills
 All-SCBA

John Macauley
 All-SCBA

References 

Cal State Los Angeles
Cal State Los Angeles Golden Eagles baseball seasons
Cal State Los Angeles Golden Eagles baseball
College World Series seasons